Oldenlandia vasudevanii is a rare plant species in the family Rubiaceae which is found in Karassury region of the Nelliampathi hills in Kerala, India.

References

Flora of Kerala
vasudevanii